Right Brain Patrol, put out on JMT label, is a studio album by jazz acoustic bassist Marc Johnson and the first with his trio featuring guitarist Ben Monder and percussionist and singer Arto Tuncboyaciyan. Jazz Music Today released the album in 1992.

Reception
The Allmusic review by Sean Westergaard awarded the album 2½ stars, stating "Right Brain Patrol features Marc Johnson in a trio setting with guitarist Ben Monder (among his first recordings) and percussionist Arto Tunçboyaciyan. Johnson is a fabulous bass player with a rich tone. Monder's playing contains shades of Bill Frisell's tone and harmonic sensibility. Tunçboyaciyan is a fine percussionist, but listeners will either love or hate the vocalizing he does on a handful of cuts. "Batuki Burundi" is a solo bass vehicle, and Johnson and Tunçboyaciyan basically divide the rest of the composing duties, with Monder contributing one piece and sharing credits on two more. The bass and guitar playing are stellar throughout, even if Monder sounds a bit derivative in this early session ("Netcong on My Mind" and "Whispers" wouldn't sound out of place on a Bill Frisell album). The title cut has Monder and Johnson trading off leads and support in a lively conversation. "Heru Nazel" has some nice arco bass work and great guitar, but also has some of the aforementioned vocals. "After You" has Johnson playing some great lead over a queasy guitar figure. Few of these tunes will really stick in your head, but they are well played and quite beautiful at times."

Track listing

Personnel
Band
Marc Johnson – upright bass
Ben Monder – electric & acoustic guitars
Arto Tunçboyaciyan – percussions & vocals

Production
Steve Byram – cover painting, design
Colin George – artwork, cover art
Günter Mattei – cover design
Cheung Ching Ming – photography
Adrian von Ripka  – mastering
David Schiffman – assistant engineer
Justin Luchter – assistant engineer, engineer
James Farber – engineer
Stefan F. Winter –  executive producer
Lee Townsend – producer

References 

1992 albums
Marc Johnson (musician) albums
JMT Records albums
Winter & Winter Records albums